Celtic competed for five trophies in the 1966–67 season and the club won all of them: the Scottish League, the Scottish Cup, the Scottish League Cup, the Glasgow Cup, and the European Cup, and completed the only ever European Quintuple. However, their European Cup victory from this season qualified them for the World Championship the following season, which they went on to lose in a playoff to Racing. Over the course of this season, Celtic scored a world record 196 goals in the major competitions they took part in.

The team from this season are commonly known as the Lisbon Lions, because the European Cup final was held in Lisbon.

Season overview

Season 1966–67 is considered Celtic's annus mirabilis. The club won every competition they entered: the Scottish League, the Scottish Cup, the Scottish League Cup, the Glasgow Cup, and the European Cup; scoring a world record total of 196 goals in the process.

The League Cup was the first trophy to be won that season, courtesy of a 1–0 win on 29 October 1966 over Rangers in the final. The Glasgow Cup was secured a week later when Celtic beat Partick Thistle 4–0; Stevie Chalmers opening the scoring, and Bobby Lennox scoring a hat-trick. Celtic's progression to the Scottish Cup was relatively straightforward aside from being taken to replay in the semi-final by Clyde. On 6 April 1967 Celtic met Aberdeen in the final, and two Willie Wallace goals eased Celtic to a 2–0 win. The league campaign proved to be a more tightly contested affair as, despite Celtic only losing twice, with two games remaining Rangers were still in contention.  Celtic's penultimate league fixture was against Rangers at Ibrox, with a draw required to clinch the title.  A brace by Jimmy Johnstone gave Celtic a 2–2 draw and the championship.

Celtic's European Cup campaign in 1966–67 was their first ever participation in Europe's premier club tournament. FC Zurich and Nantes were comfortably disposed of in the first two rounds (5–0 and 6–2 on aggregate respectively). The quarter final in March 1967 pitched Celtic against the Yugoslav champions, Vojvodina.  The Yugoslav side won the first leg in Novi Sad 1–0. The return match in Glasgow proved to be a fraught affair.  The Yugoslavs defended resolutely and threatened on the counter-attack, but Celtic levelled the tie on aggregate in the second half with a goal by Stevie Chalmers. Celtic pressed for a winner, but Vojvodina defended well and the tie looked like a play-off in neutral Rotterdam would be required.  However, in the final minute Billy McNeill headed in a Charlie Gallacher cross to see Celtic progress to the semi-final.  Celtic now faced Czechoslovakian side, Dukla Prague.  This time the first leg of the tie took place in Glasgow, with Celtic winning 3–1 courtesy of goals from Jimmy Johnstone and a Willie Wallace brace. In respect of his opponents' quality, manager Jock Stein set up Celtic to be ultra-defensive for the second leg and forsake - temporarily - their philosophy of attacking football. The tactics worked as Celtic secured a 0–0 draw to put them in the final.  However, Stein was almost apologetic about the manner of Celtic's success in that game and he felt uncomfortable in later years discussing the matter.

The final saw Celtic play Inter Milan, with the match taking place at the Estádio Nacional on the outskirts of Lisbon on 25 May 1967.  Celtic fell a goal behind after only seven minutes, Jim Craig adjudged to have fouled Renato Cappellini in the penalty box and Sandro Mazzola converting the resultant penalty. Celtic swept into constant attack after that but found Inter goalkeeper Giuliano Sarti in outstanding form. With 63 minutes played, after incessant pressure, Celtic finally equalised when Tommy Gemmell scored with a powerful 25-yard shot. The balance of play remained the same with Inter defending deeply against sustained Celtic attacking.  With about five minutes remaining, a long-range shot from Bobby Murdoch was diverted by Stevie Chalmers past a wrong-footed Sarti. It proved to be the winning goal and thus Celtic became the first British team, and the first from outside Spain, Portugal or Italy to win the competition.

Jock Stein commented after the match,

Celtic are one of only two clubs to have won the trophy with a team composed entirely of players from the club's home country; all of the players in the side were born within 30 miles of Celtic Park in Glasgow, and they subsequently became known as the 'Lisbon Lions'. The entire east stand at Celtic Park is dedicated to The Lisbon Lions, and the west stand to Jock Stein. The sight of captain Billy McNeill holding aloft the European Cup in the Estádio Nacional has become one of the iconic images of Scottish football, immortalized in a bronze statue of McNeill outside Parkhead stadium in 2015, created by John McKenna (sculptor).	

Two weeks later, on 7 June 1967, Celtic played Real Madrid in a testimonial match for the now retired Alfredo Di Stefano.  In front of over 100,000 fans at the Bernabéu Stadium, the sides engaged in a keenly fought contest which saw Bertie Auld and Real Madrid's Amancio sent off.  Di Stefano played for the first 15 minutes, but it was Jimmy Johnstone who stole the show with an exhilarating performance that had even the Spanish supporters chanting "Olé!" throughout the game in appreciation of his skill.  Johnstone capped an outstanding performance by playing the pass to Bobby Lennox for the only goal in a 1–0 win for Celtic.

Results and fixtures

Friendlies

Scottish Division One

Scottish League Cup

Scottish Cup

Glasgow Cup

European Cup

Squad and statistics

First team squad

Starting XI

|}
| width="1%" |
| style="background-color:#FFFFFF;vertical-align:top;" width="48%"|
{| style="float: right; margin-left: 1em; margin-bottom: 0.5em; width: 180px; border: #99B3FF solid 1px"
|-
| 
|-
|

League table

See also
List of Celtic F.C. seasons
Nine in a row

References

Sources

Celtic F.C. seasons
Celtic
UEFA Champions League-winning seasons
Scottish football championship-winning seasons